Charles Stamps Minter Jr. (January 23, 1915 – April 18, 2008) was a vice admiral in the United States Navy. He was Superintendent of the United States Naval Academy in Annapolis, Maryland from January 11, 1964 to June 12, 1965. Additional commands he held during his almost 40-year career in the Navy include that of USS Albemarle, USS Intrepid, Deputy Chief of Naval Operations (Logistics), Commander, Fleet Air Wing, Pacific, Commandant of Midshipmen at the United States Naval Academy and Deputy Chairman of the NATO Military Committee. He retired in 1974 and died in 2008. His wife of 67 years, Mary Margaret Skeehan Minter died 2 months later, on June 14, 2008.

References

1915 births
2008 deaths
United States Navy admirals
People from Pocahontas, Virginia
Superintendents of the United States Naval Academy
20th-century American academics